Forrest Li Xiaodong (born 1977 or 1978), is a Singaporean billionaire businessman. He is the founder, chairman and chief executive officer of Sea Limited, a company with subsidiaries including Garena and Shopee. He is also the Chairman of Lion City Sailors FC, a subsidiary of Sea Limited. He is also the founder of one of the famous game Free fire developed by his own company Garena.

Biography 
Forrest Li Xiaodong was born in Tianjin, China. He earned a bachelor's degree in engineering from Shanghai Jiaotong University, and an MBA from Stanford Graduate School of Business. 

Li did not come from generational wealth; Li was $100,000 in student loan debt and along with his wife previously lived in a single bedroom within a three-room public housing HDB flat at Braddell. He later decided to settle permanently in Singapore, taking up citizenship.

Li's first company was Garena in 2009. At the time, the company had only operated out of a single shophouse off Maxwell Road at Tanjong Pagar.

In March 2019, after the share price of his consumer internet company Sea Ltd increased by 45%, Li's net worth increased to more than $1 billion.

Li is a football fan. He is the chairman of the Lion City Sailors, a Singapore Premier League football club that was acquired by Sea in 2020.

Personal life 
Li is married and lives in Singapore. Li appeared on the August 2020 cover of Forbes Asia, the Asia edition of Forbes magazine. According to Bloomberg Billionaires Index, Li's net worth was estimated at US$4.2 billion as of September 2022, making him the 11th richest person in Singapore.

References

Living people
Naturalised citizens of Singapore
Singaporean billionaires
Stanford University alumni
1970s births